Muhammad Ashraf (born 11 October 1927) was a Pakistani wrestler. He competed in the men's freestyle lightweight at the 1956 Summer Olympics.

References

External links
 

1927 births
Living people
Pakistani male sport wrestlers
Olympic wrestlers of Pakistan
Wrestlers at the 1956 Summer Olympics
Place of birth missing (living people)
Asian Games medalists in wrestling
Wrestlers at the 1954 Asian Games
Wrestlers at the 1958 Asian Games
Medalists at the 1954 Asian Games
Asian Games bronze medalists for Pakistan
Commonwealth Games medallists in wrestling
Commonwealth Games gold medallists for Pakistan
Wrestlers at the 1958 British Empire and Commonwealth Games
Wrestlers at the 1962 British Empire and Commonwealth Games
20th-century Pakistani people
Medallists at the 1958 British Empire and Commonwealth Games
Medallists at the 1962 British Empire and Commonwealth Games